You Only Live Twice is the seventh studio album by the industrial metal project Pain, first released on 3 June 2011 via Nuclear Blast Records. It reached number 36 in the Swedish album charts.

Track listing 
 "Let Me Out" – 4:35
 "Fear the Demons" – 3:54
 "The Great Pretender" – 4:05
 "You Only Live Twice" – 4:04
 "Dirty Woman" – 4:18
 "We Want More" – 4:46
 "Leave Me Alone" (Sonic Syndicate cover) – 4:10
 "Monster" – 4:06
 "Season of the Reaper" – 6:38

Bonus disc
 "Crawling Thru Bitterness" (bonus track) – 3:58
 "The Great Pretender (Millboy & Peka P Remix)" – 3:50
 "Dirty Woman (MC Raaka Pee Remix)" – 3:44
 "You Only Live Twice (Rectifier Remix)" – 2:52
 "Leave Me Alone (Rectifier Remix)" – 3:34
 "Eleanor Rigby" (Live at Sundown Festival 2008) – 4:25
 "Follow Me" (Live in Brussels 2009) – 4:45
 "I Don't Care" (Live at Raismes Festival 2009) – 2:53
 "Bitch" (Live at Raismes Festival 2009) – 4:40

Additional bonus track
 "Unchain the Time" (bonus track) – 3:39

Charts

References

Pain (musical project) albums
2011 albums
Nuclear Blast albums
Albums produced by Peter Tägtgren